Class A Short Season (officially Short-Season A) was a level of play in Minor League Baseball in the United States from 1965 through 2020. In the hierarchy of minor league classifications, it was below Triple-A, Double-A, Class A-Advanced (created in 1990), and Class A. Teams in Class A Short Season played about 75 to 80 games per season, compared to the 130- to 140-game seasons of most professional baseball minor leagues.

As part of the 2021 reorganization of the minor leagues, Class A Short Season was eliminated along with its two leagues, the New York–Penn League and Northwest League. Nine of the 22 active short-season teams were organized into new leagues at the High-A classification level.

History
In 1965, the Northern League of Class A started a 66-game season in late June, a departure from the league's previous "full season" schedules of about 120 games. In December 1965, the Northwest League announced that it would play an 85-game schedule starting in late June 1966, limiting teams to no more than two veteran players on their 25-man rosters.

After playing the 1966 season with two short-season leagues, the New York–Penn League also moved to a short-season format, playing an 80-game schedule beginning in late June 1967. The three leagues would continue to play short seasons through 1971. In February 1972, the Northern League folded, due to reduced support from both fans and Major League Baseball (MLB) teams, leaving the New York–Penn League and Northwest League as the only two short-season leagues. Both leagues would operate annually through 2019.

Class A Short Season was originally the fourth-highest level in the minor leagues; with the addition of Class A-Advanced in 1990, Class A Short Season became fifth in the overall hierarchy:
 Triple-A
 Double-A
 Class A-Advanced
 Class A ("Full-Season A")
 Class A Short Season ("Short-Season A")
 Rookie league

Before the 2021 season, MLB restructured the minor leagues, discontinuing the use of all historical league names within Minor League Baseball and eliminating Class A Short Season. This effectively contracted Class A from having three levels to two, with Class A-Advanced and full-season Class A continuing on as "High-A" and "Low-A", respectively.

Dispersal of Class A Short Season teams
When the classification was ended before the 2021 season, there were two leagues with a total of 22 active teams.

Of the 14 active teams in the New York–Penn League:
 four joined the MLB Draft League: Mahoning Valley Scrappers, State College Spikes, West Virginia Black Bears, and Williamsport Crosscutters
 three joined the High-A East league: Aberdeen IronBirds, Brooklyn Cyclones, and Hudson Valley Renegades
 two joined the Futures Collegiate Baseball League: Vermont Lake Monsters and Norwich Sea Unicorns
 two joined the Perfect Game Collegiate Baseball League: Batavia Muckdogs and Auburn Doubledays
 two folded: Staten Island Yankees, Lowell Spinners
 one joined the independent Frontier League: Tri-City ValleyCats

Of the eight active teams in the Northwest League:
 six joined the High-A West league: Eugene Emeralds, Everett AquaSox, Hillsboro Hops, Spokane Indians, Tri-City Dust Devils, and Vancouver Canadians
 one joined the independent Pioneer League: Boise Hawks
 one joined the amateur Mavericks Independent Baseball League: Salem-Keizer Volcanoes

Purpose
Teams in short-season leagues played schedules of about 75 to 80 games, starting in mid-June and ending in early September, with only a few off-days during the season. The late start of the season was designed to allow college baseball players to complete their college seasons in the spring, be selected in the MLB draft in June, signed, and then be immediately placed in a competitive league. Players in short-season leagues were a mixture of newly signed draftees who were considered more advanced than other draftees, and second-year pros who were not yet ready, or for whom there was not space, to move up the minor league hierarchy. Second-year pros were often assigned to "extended spring training" in Florida or Arizona during April and May, before reporting to their short-season leagues.

Notes

References

Minor league baseball